Makishima (written: 巻島 or 牧島) is a Japanese surname. Notable people with the surname include:

 (born 1976), Japanese politician

Fictional characters:
Shogo Makishima, the main antagonist in Psycho-Pass
Agito Makishima, a major character in Bio Booster Armor Guyver

Japanese-language surnames